Belal Mabrouk (born 2 August 1984) is an Egyptian handball player who competed in the 2008 Summer Olympics.

His brothers, Ashraf, Hazem, Hussein, Ibrahim and Hassan, are also international handball players.

References

External links

1984 births
Living people
Egyptian male handball players
Olympic handball players of Egypt
Handball players at the 2008 Summer Olympics
21st-century Egyptian people